Abdoulaye Touré (c. 1920-July 1985) was a politician in the first Guinean republic. He was arrested after a coup in April 1984, and was executed in July 1985.

Early life 
Abdoulaye Touré was born in Kankan on December 16 around 1920, the grandson of Samori Touré (c. 1830 - 1900), the founder of the Wassoulou Empire. He was trained as a physician, serving in Mali and in Kankan in the 1950s.

Career 
He became an active member of the Democratic Party of Guinea, and was ambassador to Mali in the 1960s.
He became Guinea's ambassador to the United Nations in 1970, succeeding Achkar Marof, who had been arrested the year before.
On 19 June 1972 he was appointed a Central committee member and Minister of External Trade.
On 1 June 1979 he became Minister of External Affairs.
After the coup that followed the death of Sekou Toure, on 3 April 1984 he was arrested.
He was executed in Kindia in July 1985.

References

1920s births
1985 deaths
Government ministers of Guinea
Executed Guinean people
People executed by Guinea
People from Kankan
Guinean physicians
Democratic Party of Guinea – African Democratic Rally politicians
Ambassadors of Guinea to Mali
Permanent Representatives of Guinea to the United Nations
20th-century physicians